Eilema notifera is a moth of the subfamily Arctiinae first described by Max Saalmüller in 1880. It is found on Madagascar.

Subspecies
Eilema notifera notifera
Eilema notifera antsalova Toulgoët, 1960

References

notifera